Barbara Reynolds could refer to:

Barbara Reynolds (1914-2015), English academic and translator
Barbara Ann Reynolds (born 1942), American journalist
Barbara Leonard Reynolds (1915-1990), American author and peace activist